Andy Linden may refer to:
Andy Linden (racing driver) (1922–1987), American race car driver
Andy Linden (actor), British actor

See also
Linden (disambiguation)